Acalolepta nana is a species of beetle in the family Cerambycidae. It was described by Hua in 2002.

References

Acalolepta
Beetles described in 2002